Mary Gluckman (1917–1990) was an Italian linguist and anthropologist.  She was the wife of Professor Max Gluckman at Manchester University and worked at her husband's side for many years. After his death in 1975, she served with Voluntary Service Overseas for over two years in Sierra Leone.

Early life
She was born in Italy in 1917. Her father, an Italian architect, died before Mary was born; her mother died when Mary was two years old. As a result, she was brought up by relatives of her mother, a well-to-do family. Mary attended a girl's boarding school, Wycombe Abbey, before going on to study languages at Oxford University. While she was at Oxford, she met her future husband Max. After they married, she dropped out of Oxford and traveled to Southern Africa to help him with his field work among the Barotse and Zulu.

Life in Africa
The Gluckman's first son was born on March 12, 1943, in Cape Town. Some of the conflicts of family life and being the wife of a social anthropologist are shown in Lyn Schumaker's account which states that Mary became involved in the work of the Rhodes-Livingstone Institute (RLI).

Life in England after her return from Africa
Mary was politically active throughout her adult life. What she had seen of racism in South Africa and Colonialism throughout Southern Africa motivated her to engage in movements struggling against Britain's colonial hegemony. Mary took an active part in the field of community work in the severely disadvantaged Moss Side area of Manchester. She facilitated the placing of a Sierra Leonian social anthropologist, Eyo Bassey Ndem, in a large community project funded by Sir Arthur Lewis.

Mary supported the Lancashire cricket team.

References

Publications

Linguists from Italy
Women linguists
Italian women anthropologists
Alumni of the University of Oxford
People educated at Wycombe Abbey
People associated with the Rhodes-Livingstone Institute
1917 births
1990 deaths
20th-century linguists
Italian emigrants to the United Kingdom
British expatriates in South Africa